The Itonama people are an ethnic group in northeastern Bolivia. They numbered 16,158 in 2012 with 1,249 people speaking the Itonama language natively.

References

Ethnic groups in Bolivia